Tinoliodes benguetensis is a moth in the family Erebidae. It was described by Alfred Ernest Wileman in 1915. It is found in the Philippines.

References

Moths described in 1915
Callimorphina